= RC Hirnyk =

Ukrainian rugby union club, based in Kryvyi Rih

RC Girnik
- Full name: Rugby Club Girnik
- Nickname: Girnik (Miners)
- Location: Kryvyi Rih, Ukraine
- Ground: Shakhti Rodina Stadium
Team kit

RC Girnik (Ukrainian: РК Гірник, romanized: RK Girnik) is a Ukrainian rugby union club in Kryvyi Rih. They currently play in the Ukrainian rugby second league.
